Oulad Hriz Sahel is a town and rural commune in the Casablanca-Settat region of Morocco. It is located 129 kilometers from Rabat and 40 kilometers from Casablanca.

References 

Populated places in Berrechid Province
Rural communes of Casablanca-Settat